ITA Award for Best Actress in a Negative Role is an award given by Indian Television Academy Awards for TV serials, to recognize a female actor who has delivered an outstanding performance in a negative role, that is in the role of an antagonist.

Surekha Sikri has won the award three times, highest for anyone and two consecutive awards for years 2008 and 2009.  Sikri is also the oldest winner, winning her third award in this category at the age of 71. Helly Shah is the youngest winner, she won at the age of 23.

Winners

References 

Indian Television Academy Awards
Awards for actresses